The slender harvest mouse(Reithrodontomys gracilis) is a species of rodent in the family Cricetidae. A small mouse-like rodent distributed throughout a portion Central America.

Description
The slender harvest mouse has short pale pelage. Upper areas and back appearing somewhat darker than their under sides which vary from a pinkish cinnamon color to tawny, orange, or white. Ears are brown or black with little pelage. The coloration of the feet may vary seasonally and geographically. Their tails are slender and scaly with scattered hairs and may be bicolored to clove brown.

Range and Habitat 
The slender harvest mouse can be found in Belize, Costa Rica, El Salvador, Guatemala, Honduras, Mexico, and Nicaragua. General distribution is in elevations from sea level to near 1,400 meters from southern Mexico in the Yucatán Peninsula to northwestern Costa Rica. Populations favor semiarid and arid areas with apparent ground cover, from tropical evergreen and deciduous forests to cactus covered desert areas. Never reported as common and no well published estimated of numbers. It is notable that this species is also somewhat scansorial, being found on cliffs, in trees, and among roots.

Reproduction
Very little is known of the slender harvest mouse's reproduction. Litter sizes seems to range from 2 to 4, but three being average. The reproductive season is likely extended from late winter to mid-autumn.

Phylogeny
The slender harvest mouse may be considered under the subfamily Muridae and is within the subgenera of Aprodon and in the clade R. mexicanus. The closest relation to the slender harvest mouse is the Cozumel harvest mouse, R. spectabilis. Five subspecies of R. gracilis are currently recognized, but do not form a monophyletic group. The slender harvest mouse differs in the other members of its subgenus in that it is smaller with an elongated skull. Limb bones of a small harvest mouse, possibly R. gracilis, was found in a cave on the Yucatán Peninsula and dated to the Pleistocene.

References

 Baillie, J. 1996.  Reithrodontomys gracilis.   2006 IUCN Red List of Threatened Species.   Downloaded on 20 July 2007.
 Musser, G. G. and M. D. Carleton. 2005. Superfamily Muroidea. pp. 894–1531 in Mammal Species of the World a Taxonomic and Geographic Reference. D. E. Wilson and D. M. Reeder eds. Johns Hopkins University Press, Baltimore.
 Young, Carole J. and Jones, J. Knox Jr. April 27, 1984. Mammalian Species: Reithrodontomys gracilis. No. 218. pp. 1–3 in The American Society of Mammalogists. C.J. Young and J. K. Jones eds. Texas tech University. 

Reithrodontomys
Rodents of Central America
Mammals described in 1897
Taxonomy articles created by Polbot